HMS Medway was a  which served with the Royal Navy during the First World War. The M class were an improvement on the previous , capable of higher speed. Originally laid down as HMS Redwing by J. Samuel White at East Cowes on the Isle of Wight, the vessel was renamed before being launched on 8 March 1916. The vessel was allocated to the Grand Fleet and served in the Second Battle of Heligoland Bight in support of the First Light Cruiser Squadron in their action against German light cruisers and minesweepers. During the action, the ship did not record any hits. After the War, the destroyer was placed in reserve and subsequently sold to be broken up on 9 May 1921.

Design and development
Medway was one of eighteen s ordered by the British Admiralty in May 1915 as part of the Fifth War Construction Programme. The M-class was an improved version of the earlier  destroyers, required to reach a higher speed in order to counter rumoured German fast destroyers. It transpired that the German ships did not exist.

Displacement was  normal and  full load. The vessel achieved  in trials. Three funnels were fitted.

Armament consisted of three single QF  Mk IV guns on the ship's centreline, with one on the forecastle, one aft on a raised platform and one between the middle and aft funnels on a bandstand. Torpedo armament consisted of two twin mounts for  torpedoes. A single QF 2-pounder  "pom-pom" anti-aircraft gun was mounted between the torpedo tubes. The ship had a complement of 80 officers and ratings.

Construction and career
Redwing was laid down by J. Samuel White at East Cowes on the Isle of Wight on 2 November 1915 with the yard number 1468, and launched on 19 April 1916. The ship was completed on 30 June 1916 and joined the Grand Fleet. By this time, the ship's name had already been changed twice, initially to  Medora and then subsequently Medway. The final name was in honour of the river in South East England. The vessel was deployed as part of the Grand Fleet, joining the Thirteenth Destroyer Flotilla based at Scapa Flow.

At the Second Battle of Heligoland Bight on 17 November 1917, the destroyer was one of two, the other being the more modern Vendetta, screening the First Light Cruiser Squadron as they sought to destroy a flotilla of German minesweepers. This proved to be the last involvement by the class in a major battle during the conflict. The vessel was transferred to Buncrana with the Second Destroyer Flotilla during the last year of the war.

After the armistice, Medway was transferred Portsmouth. However, this was a temporary post and during the following year, the destroyer was moved to the local defence flotilla at Portland, operating with a reserve complement. As the Royal Navy returned to a peacetime level of mobilisation, surplus vessels were culled, and so, on 9 May 1921, Medway was sold to Thos. W. Ward of Milford Haven and subsequently broken up.

Pennant numbers

References

Citations

Bibliography

 
 
 
 
 
 
 
 

 
 
 

1916 ships
Admiralty M-class destroyers
Ships built on the Isle of Wight
World War I destroyers of the United Kingdom